Salangichthys microdon, the Japanese icefish, is a species of icefish found in Japan, Korea and the Russian Far East. With the recent removal of S. ishikawae to the genus Neosalangichthys this species is the only remaining member of the genus Salangichthys. Despite its small size, it is considered a food fish and caught in commercial fisheries.

Salangichthys microdon may show both migratory (anadromous; adults in salt water but moving to fresh water to breed) and non-migratory (always in brackish or fresh water) life histories, with both types periodically occurring together.

References

Salangidae
Fish of Japan
Fish of Korea
Fish of Russia
Fish of East Asia
Fish described in 1860
Monotypic ray-finned fish genera